Ordway is a surname. Notable people with the surname include:

 Alfred Ordway (1821–1897), American landscape and portrait painter
 Bill Ordway (1917–1999), American gridiron football player and coach
 Elizabeth Ordway (1828–1897), American advocate for women's suffrage
 Frederick I. Ordway III (1927–2014), American space scientist and author
 Glenn Ordway (born 1951), American radio and television broadcaster
 Jerry Ordway (born 1957), American comic book artist and writer
 John Ordway (c. 1775 – c. 1817), member of the Lewis and Clark expedition
 John M. Ordway (born 1950), American diplomat
 John P. Ordway (1824–1880), American doctor, composer, music entrepreneur, and politician
 Jonathan Ordway (born 1978), American football player
 Katharine Ordway (1899–1979), American philanthropist
 Lester Ordway, American politician and college instructor in Maine
 Lucius Pond Ordway (1862–1948), American businessman, investor in the Minnesota Mining and Manufacturing Company (3M)
 Melissa Ordway (born 1983), American actress and model
 Nehemiah G. Ordway (1828–1907), American politician and governor of Dakota Territory
 Samuel H. Ordway (1860–1934), American lawyer and judge
 Samuel H. Ordway Jr. (1900–1971), American lawyer and civil service reforme
 Scott Ordway (born 1984), American composer and conductor

See also
 Ordway (disambiguation)